Pipiza bimaculata is a species of hoverfly, from the family Syrphidae, in the order Diptera.

Description
External images
For terms see Morphology of Diptera Wing length 4·5–6 ·5 mm. Abdomen large yellow spots. Tarsae 1 all segments black. Face not broadened towards mouth edge with eye margins parallel. Wing diffusely infuscated or hyaline. 3rd segment  of antenna longer than wide. See references for determination.

Distribution
Palearctic Atlantic Europe. All Europe if older determinations are correct.

Biology
Habitat:Quercus woodland. Flowers visited include Ranunculus.
 Flies May to June .

References

Diptera of Europe
Pipizinae
Insects described in 1822
Taxa named by Johann Wilhelm Meigen